Guo Kexin (1923–2006), also known as Ke-Xin Guo or K. H. Kuo (Ke-Hsin Kuo), was a Chinese chemical engineer, physicist, metallurgist and crystallographer. He was an academician of the Chinese Academy of Sciences, and is considered the main pioneer of electron microscopy in China.

Life
Guo was born on August 23, 1923. In 1941, he graduated from Chongqing Nankai Middle School. He graduated from Zhejiang University in 1946 with a Bachelor of Engineering degree in chemical engineering. In 1947, Guo went to study in Sweden.

Guo was the Director and a senior researcher at the Beijing Electron Microscope Open Laboratory (a.k.a. Beijing Laboratory of Electron Microscopy) and the Center for Condensed Matter Physics and the Institute of Physics, Chinese Academy of Sciences. Guo was the main founder of the Chinese Society for Electron Microscopy (a.k.a. Chinese Electron Microscopy Society, CEMS; 中国电子显微镜会), and served as its Director/President from 1982 to 1996.

Recognition
In 1980, Guo was elected as a member of the Chinese Academy of Sciences. He was also a foreign member of the Royal Swedish Academy of Engineering Sciences (IVA), and received an Honorary Doctorate from the Royal Institute of Technology (KTH), Sweden.

The K. H. Kuo Education Fund is named after him.

References

Archive
Electron microscopy of aperiodic materials Invited and contributed papers from a symposium at the ICEM14, Cancun, Mexico, 3 September 1998, in honour of Professor K.H. Kuo - by Lian-Mao Peng and J. L. Aragón

External links
 Guo Kexin's biography at China Vitae 
 Guo Kexin's short CV at China Vitae 
 
 Homepage of the K.H.Kuo Education Fund 
 K. H. Kuo Home Page  

1923 births
2006 deaths
Chinese chemical engineers
Chinese metallurgists
Crystallographers
Members of the Chinese Academy of Sciences
People from Fuzhou
Physicists from Fujian
KTH Royal Institute of Technology alumni
TWAS laureates
Zhejiang University alumni
Chongqing Nankai Secondary School alumni
Chinese expatriates in Sweden